is a railway station located in the city of  Kakamigahara,  Gifu Prefecture,  Japan, operated by the private railway operator Meitetsu.

Lines

Station layout
Ogase Station has two ground-level opposed side platforms connected by a level crossing. The station is unattended.

Platforms

Adjacent stations

History
Ogase Station opened on September 20, 1927.

Surrounding area
Lake Ogase

See also
 List of Railway Stations in Japan

External links

  

Railway stations in Japan opened in 1927
Stations of Nagoya Railroad
Railway stations in Gifu Prefecture
Kakamigahara, Gifu